The Antioquia brushfinch (Atlapetes blancae) is a poorly known species of bird from the family Passerellidae. It was scientifically described in 2007 on basis of three museum specimens from Antioquia, Colombia, which were previously labelled as slaty brushfinches (Atlapetus schistaceus). The specific epithet blancae refers to the whitish underparts of the new species, while also commemorating the Colombian lepidopterologist , the wife of ornithologist Thomas M. Donegan (who described the species). All three museum skins were collected in the 20th century, but only one label has a date, which is given as 1971. Subsequent fieldwork in Antioquia has failed to find this species again. The species description has been approved by the South American Classification Committee. It has been recommended for a critically endangered status.

Rediscovery
In January 2018, a Colombian resident of San Pedro de los Milagros noticed this bird on his way to Sunday mass. Since then, 4 subpopulations have been rediscovered, with at least 20 individuals between them. The bird had been previously overlooked despite living relatively close to the city of Medellín, which is home to 3.7 million people. Since then, the American Bird Conservancy has adopted a stance of optimism, stating that “Colombian researchers now know what kind of habitat to search and are continuing to find more birds. This brushfinch species is persisting in fairly small patches of low scrub close to people. Opportunities to protect remaining habitat patches as new reserves and to quickly restore working lands using silvipasture techniques [combining trees, forage, and livestock] hold great potential to benefit this species, but action must be taken quickly".

References

External links
Conservationists concerned for new bird species
Nueva especie de Gorrion Colombiano en Peligro de Extincion
New Bird Species Recognised in Colombia, May Already be Extinct
Recognize Atlapetes blancae as a species

Atlapetes
Endemic birds of Colombia
Critically endangered animals
Critically endangered biota of South America
Birds described in 2007